Allan McKeown Presents Ltd is a television, film, and theatre production company that was created and founded in 2007 by British television and stage producer Allan McKeown, the late husband of actress Tracey Ullman. It has produced projects for American, British, and Indian television.

Since McKeown's death in 2013, Tracey Ullman has taken over as chairwoman of the company in her husband's absence.

Television
Mumbai Calling (2007)
Tracey Ullman's State of the Union (2008–2010)
Mumbai Calling (2009)
Tracey Ullman's Show (2016–18)
Tracey Breaks the News (2017)
Tracey Breaks the News (2017–18)

References

Television production companies of the United States
Television production companies of the United Kingdom
Mass media companies established in 2007